First Presbyterian Church (and variations such as Old First Presbyterian Church or First Presbyterian Church and Rectory) may refer to:

Canada
First Presbyterian Church (Edmonton), Alberta

Thailand
First Presbyterian Church, Samray, in Bangkok

United States

Alabama
First Presbyterian Church (Birmingham, Alabama)
First Presbyterian Church (Eutaw, Alabama)
First Presbyterian Church (Greenville, Alabama)
First Presbyterian Church (Jacksonville, Alabama)
First Presbyterian Church (Talladega, Alabama)
First Presbyterian Church of Wetumpka

Arizona
First Presbyterian Church of Florence
First Presbyterian Church (Phoenix, Arizona)

Arkansas
First Presbyterian Church (Clarksville, Arkansas)
First Presbyterian Church (Dardanelle, Arkansas)
Berry House (Dardanelle, Arkansas), the previous building used by the church
First Presbyterian Church (DeQueen, Arkansas)
First Presbyterian Church (Des Arc, Arkansas)
First Presbyterian Church (El Dorado, Arkansas)
First Presbyterian Church (Fordyce, Arkansas)
First Presbyterian Church (Heber Springs, Arkansas)
First Presbyterian Church (Hot Springs, Arkansas)
First Presbyterian Church (Little Rock, Arkansas)
First Presbyterian Church (Lonoke, Arkansas)
First Presbyterian Church (Nashville, Arkansas)
First Presbyterian Church (Newport, Arkansas)
First Presbyterian Church Manse (North Little Rock, Arkansas)
First Presbyterian Church (Stamps, Arkansas)

California
First Presbyterian Church Sanctuary Building, in Alameda, California
First Presbyterian Church of Hollywood, Los Angeles, California
First Presbyterian Church (Napa, California)
First Presbyterian Church of Oakland
First Presbyterian Church of San Jose
First Presbyterian Church (San Luis Obispo, California)
First Presbyterian Church (Vallejo, California)

Colorado
First Presbyterian Church (Canon City, Colorado)
First Presbyterian Church (Colorado Springs, Colorado)
Eckert Presbyterian Church or First Presbyterian Church
First Presbyterian Church of Golden and Unger House, in Golden, Colorado
First Presbyterian Church of Ramah

Connecticut
Fish Church or First Presbyterian Church of Stamford

Delaware
Old First Presbyterian Church (Newark, Delaware)
Old First Presbyterian Church (Wilmington, Delaware)

Florida

First Presbyterian Church (Lynn Haven, Florida)
First Presbyterian Church Archeological Site
First Presbyterian Church (Miami, Florida)
First Presbyterian Church (Tallahassee, Florida)

Georgia
First Presbyterian Church of Atlanta
First Presbyterian Church (Augusta, Georgia)
First Presbyterian Church (Cartersville, Georgia)
First Presbyterian Church (Columbus, Georgia)
First Presbyterian Church (Macon, Georgia)
First Presbyterian Church (Tifton, Georgia), contributing in Tifton Residential Historic District
First Presbyterian Church (Valdosta, Georgia)

Idaho
First Presbyterian Church (Idaho Falls, Idaho)
First Presbyterian Church (Kamiah, Idaho)
First Presbyterian Church (Lapwai, Idaho)

Illinois
First Presbyterian Church (Champaign, Illinois)
First Presbyterian Church (Springfield, Illinois)
First Presbyterian Church (Vandalia, Illinois)

Indiana
First Presbyterian Church (Aurora, Indiana)
First Presbyterian Church (Hartford City, Indiana)
First Presbyterian Church (Seymour, Indiana)
First Presbyterian Church (South Bend, Indiana)

Iowa
First Presbyterian Church (Davenport, Iowa)
First Presbyterian Church (Marion, Iowa)
First Presbyterian Church (Muscatine, Iowa)
First Presbyterian Church (West Bend, Iowa)

Kansas
First Presbyterian Church of Abilene
First Presbyterian Church (Gardner, Kansas)
First Presbyterian Church (Girard, Kansas)
First Presbyterian Church (Hays, Kansas)
First Presbyterian Church, Leavenworth

Kentucky
First Presbyterian Church (Ashland, Kentucky)
First Presbyterian Church (Danville, Kentucky)
First Presbyterian Church (Elizabethtown, Kentucky)
First Presbyterian Church (Flemingsburg, Kentucky)
First Presbyterian Church (Glasgow, Kentucky)
First Presbyterian Church (Lexington, Kentucky)

Louisiana
First Presbyterian Church (Ruston, Louisiana)
First Presbyterian Church (Shreveport, Louisiana), a National Register of Historic Places listing in Caddo Parish, Louisiana

Maryland
First Presbyterian Church and Manse (Baltimore, Maryland)

Massachusetts
First Presbyterian Church (Newburyport, Massachusetts)

Michigan
First Presbyterian Church of Blissfield
First Presbyterian Church (Cass City, Michigan)
First Presbyterian Church (Coldwater, Michigan)
First Presbyterian Church (Detroit, Michigan)
Saline First Presbyterian Church

Minnesota
First Presbyterian Church (Hastings, Minnesota)
First Presbyterian Church (Mankato, Minnesota)

Mississippi
Old First Presbyterian Church (Kosciusko, Mississippi)
First Presbyterian Church of Meridian
First Presbyterian Church of Natchez
 First Presbyterian Church (Jackson, Mississippi)

Missouri
First Presbyterian Church (Keytesville, Missouri)
First Presbyterian Church (La Grange, Missouri)
First Presbyterian Church (Marshall, Missouri)

Montana

First Presbyterian Church (Bozeman, Montana)
First Presbyterian Church (Deer Lodge, Montana), in Deer Lodge Central Business Historic District, designed by Beezer Brothers
First Presbyterian Church and Manse (Forsyth, Montana)
First Presbyterian Church (Lewistown, Montana)
First Presbyterian Church of Whitefish

Nebraska

First Presbyterian Church (Spalding, Nebraska)

Nevada
First Presbyterian Church (Virginia City, Nevada), a church in the Virginia City Historic District

New Jersey
First Presbyterian Church of Elizabeth
First Church of Hanover or First Presbyterian Church of Hanover, in Livingston, New Jersey
First Presbyterian Church (Morristown, New Jersey)
First Presbyterian Church (New Brunswick, New Jersey)
Old First Presbyterian Church (Newark, New Jersey) or First Presbyterian Church and Cemetery
First Presbyterian Church of Rumson
First Presbyterian Church (Trenton, New Jersey)
First Presbyterian Church of Wantage, in Sussex, New Jersey
First Presbyterian Church of Orange, New Jersey

New York
First Presbyterian Church (Batavia, New York)
First Presbyterian Church (Brockport, New York)
First Presbyterian Church (Brooklyn), part of the Brooklyn Heights Historic District
First Presbyterian Church (Buffalo, New York)
First Presbyterian Church of Chester
First Presbyterian Church Complex (Cortland, New York)
First Presbyterian Church (Delhi, New York)
First Presbyterian Church (Dundee, New York)
First Presbyterian Church of Avon, in East Avon, New York
First Presbyterian Church of Far Rockaway
First Presbyterian Church (Glens Falls, New York)
First Presbyterian Church (Gouverneur, New York)
Sparta First Presbyterian Church, in Groveland Station, New York
First Presbyterian Church of Hector
United Methodist Church of the Highlands or First Presbyterian Church of Highland Falls
First Presbyterian Church in Jamaica
First Presbyterian Church (Manhattan)
First Presbyterian Church of Marcellus
First Presbyterian Church of Margaretville
First Presbyterian Church of Mumford
First Presbyterian Church and Lewis Pintard House, in New Rochelle, New York
First Presbyterian Church (Niagara Falls, New York)
First Presbyterian Church of Ontario Center
First Presbyterian Church of Oyster Bay
First Presbyterian Church (Plattsburgh, New York)
First Presbyterian Church of Dailey Ridge, in Potsdam, New York
First Presbyterian Church (Poughkeepsie, New York)
First Presbyterian Church Rectory (Poughkeepsie, New York)
First Presbyterian Church (Preble, New York)
First Presbyterian Church (Rochester, New York)
First Presbyterian Church (Sag Harbor, New York)
First Presbyterian Church (Smithtown, New York)
First Presbyterian Church (Spencer, New York)
First Presbyterian Church of Ulysses, in Trumansburg, New York
First Presbyterian Church of Tuscarora
First Presbyterian Church (Utica, New York)
First Presbyterian Church (Valatie, New York)
First Presbyterian Church (Waterloo, New York)

North Carolina
First Presbyterian Church (Charlotte, North Carolina)
First Presbyterian Church (Fayetteville, North Carolina)
First Presbyterian Church (Franklin, North Carolina)
First Presbyterian Church (Goldsboro, North Carolina)
First Presbyterian Church (Hickory, North Carolina)
First Presbyterian Church (Highlands, North Carolina)
First Presbyterian Church (Lincolnton, North Carolina)
First Presbyterian Church (Marion, North Carolina)
First Presbyterian Church and Churchyard, in New Bern, North Carolina
First Presbyterian Church (Wilmington, North Carolina)

North Dakota
First Presbyterian Church of Steele

Ohio
Covenant First Presbyterian Church, in Cincinnati, Ohio
First Presbyterian Church of Maumee Chapel
First Presbyterian Church (Napoleon, Ohio)
First Presbyterian Church (Portsmouth, Ohio)
First Presbyterian Church (Troy, Ohio)
First Presbyterian Church of Wapakoneta

Oklahoma
First Presbyterian Church (Atoka, Oklahoma)
First Presbyterian Church of Chandler
First Presbyterian Church of Coweta
First Presbyterian Church of Lawton
First Presbyterian Church (McAlester, Oklahoma)
First Presbyterian Church (Sallisaw, Oklahoma)
First Presbyterian Church of Tonkawa
First Presbyterian Church (Tulsa)
First Presbyterian Church (Waurika, Oklahoma)

Oregon
First Presbyterian Church (Cottage Grove, Oregon)
First Presbyterian Church (Portland, Oregon)
First Presbyterian Church of Redmond
First Presbyterian Church (Roseburg, Oregon)

Pennsylvania
First Presbyterian Church (Bethlehem, Pennsylvania)
First Presbyterian Church (Philadelphia, Pennsylvania)
First Presbyterian Church 1793, in Washington, Pennsylvania
First Presbyterian Church of West Chester

South Carolina
First Presbyterian Church (Columbia, South Carolina)
First Presbyterian Church (Rock Hill, South Carolina)
First Presbyterian Church of Woodruff

South Dakota
First Presbyterian Church of Langford

Tennessee
First Presbyterian Church (Chattanooga, Tennessee)
First Presbyterian Church (Clarksville, Tennessee)
First Presbyterian Church Manse (Clarksville, Tennessee)
First Presbyterian Church (Cleveland, Tennessee)
First Presbyterian Church of Clifton
First Presbyterian Church (Cookeville, Tennessee), a National Register of Historic Places listing in Putnam County, Tennessee
First Presbyterian Church, 403 South Main Street, Covington, Tennessee, contributing in South Main Street Historic District (Covington, Tennessee)
First Presbyterian Church (Greeneville, Tennessee)
First Presbyterian Church Cemetery, in Knoxville, Tennessee
First Presbyterian Church (McMinnville, Tennessee)
First Presbyterian Church (Memphis, Tennessee)
First Presbyterian Church (Murfreesboro, Tennessee)
Downtown Presbyterian Church (Nashville)
First Presbyterian Church of Pulaski
First Presbyterian Church (Shelbyville, Tennessee)
First Presbyterian Church (Sweetwater, Tennessee)

Texas
First Presbyterian Church (Abilene, Texas)
First Presbyterian Church of Dallas
First Presbyterian Church (Galveston, Texas)
First Presbyterian Church (Houston, Texas)
First Presbyterian Church (Mineral Wells, Texas)
First Presbyterian Church (Orange, Texas)
First Presbyterian Church (Palestine, Texas)
First Presbyterian Church (Paris, Texas)
First Presbyterian Church (San Angelo, Texas)
First Presbyterian Church (Van Horn, Texas)

Utah
First Presbyterian Church of Salt Lake City

Virginia
First Presbyterian Church (Arlington, Virginia)

Washington
First Presbyterian Church (Tacoma, Washington)

West Virginia
First Presbyterian Church/Calvary Temple Evangelical Church, in Parkersburg, West Virginia

Wisconsin
First Presbyterian Church (Oshkosh, Wisconsin)
First Presbyterian Church (Racine, Wisconsin)

See also
List of Presbyterian churches